Novosklyuikha is a rural locality (a selo) and the administrative center of Novosklyuikhinsky Selsoviet, Rubtsovsky District, Altai Krai, Russia. The population was 670 as of 2013. There are 6 streets.

Geography 
Novosklyuikha is located 19 km east of Rubtsovsk (the district's administrative centre) by road.

References 

Rural localities in Rubtsovsky District